Chodel  is a village in Opole Lubelskie County, Lublin Voivodeship, in eastern Poland. It is the seat of the gmina (administrative district) called Gmina Chodel.

During the Holocaust, the Jewish population of the town -- numbering 750 to 950 Jews -- was murdered.

The village has a current population of 1,400.

References

Chodel
Lesser Poland
Lublin Governorate
Lublin Voivodeship (1919–1939)